Ernest Marie Adam (8 November 1899 – 5 August 1985) was a Belgian politician. He was a member of the Chamber of Representatives and was senator of Belgium.

References
 Paul VAN MOLLE, Het Belgisch Parlement, 1894-1972, Antwerp, 1972
 Helmut GAUS, Politiek Biografisch Lexicon. Belgische ministers en staatssecretarissen 1960-1980, Brussels, 1989.

External links 
 Ernest Adam in ODIS - Online Database for Intermediary Structures

1985 deaths
Members of the Chamber of Representatives (Belgium)
1899 births
Place of birth missing